The Salle Favart, officially the Théâtre de l'Opéra-Comique, is a Paris opera house and theatre, the current home of the Opéra-Comique. It was built from 1893 to 1898 in a neo-Baroque style to the designs of the French architect Louis Bernier and is located on the Place Boïeldieu just south of the Boulevard des Italiens.

Background
The Salle Favart is the third theatre with this name on this site. The first Salle Favart, built to the designs of Jean-François Heurtier, opened on 28 April 1783. Charles Simon Favart was the company's director at the time. It was destroyed by fire on the night of 14 or 15 January 1838. It was destroyed by fire on 25 May 1887.

Competition
After long deliberation following the second fire, a decision was finally reached to rebuild on the same constricted site. A competition was held, judged by five winners of the Grand Prix de Rome (including Charles Garnier, the architect of the Opéra), which ensured the design would reflect academic and official tastes. Because of disputes within the profession, more avant-garde architects did not participate. The winner of the competition was Louis Bernier (a former student of Honoré Daumet at the École des Beaux-Arts), who had won the Prix de Rome in 1872.

Construction and design
The new Salle Favart, built from 1893 to 1898, is typical of Beaux-Arts architecture. The neo-Baroque facade is an adaptation of Garnier's design for the Opéra, and the elaborate exterior and interior decoration shows the influence of both Garnier and Daumet. The auditorium has a horseshoe shape with four galleries, a traditional design with roots reaching as far back as the 17th century. The structure has iron framework for reasons of fire resistance (the use of iron in theatre construction began in the 1780s), but unlike more forward-looking architects, Bernier concealed the frame with heavy stone.

In keeping with the neo-Baroque design, nearly photo-realistic allegorical paintings were commissioned to decorate the theatre's foyers, and in spite of budgetary constraints, the decorators "managed to produce an interior of overbearing opulence, especially in the lavishly histrionic, gilt-dripping stuccowork of the auditorium." The critical reception was quite varied, with the rationalists attacking the "delirious frivolity" of the design, and the traditionalists defending it as appropriate for the operettas to be performed inside.

Photographs of the interior

Architectural drawings by Bernier

Notable premieres

 Louise by Charpentier (2 February 1900)
 Pelléas et Mélisande by Debussy (30 April 1902)
 Ariane et Barbe-Bleue by Dukas (10 May 1907)
 L'heure espagnole by Ravel (19 May 1911)
 Le pauvre matelot by Milhaud (16 December 1927)

Notes

Bibliography
 Ayers, Andrew (2004). The Architecture of Paris. Stuttgart; London: Edition Axel Menges. .
 Mead, Christopher Curtis (1996). "Bernier, Stanislas-Louis", vol. 3, in The Dictionary of Art, edited by Jane Turner. London: Macmillan. . Also at Oxford Art Online (subscription required).
 Simeone, Nigel (2000). Paris: A Musical Gazetteer. Yale University Press. .
 Wild, Nicole ([1989]). Dictionnaire des théâtres parisiens au XIXe siècle: les théâtres et la musique. Paris: Aux Amateurs de livres. .  (paperback). View formats and editions at WorldCat.

Opera houses in Paris
Buildings and structures in the 2nd arrondissement of Paris
Music venues completed in 1898
Theatres completed in 1898